2015–16 Hong Kong Premier League (also known as BOCG Life Hong Kong Premier League for sponsorship reasons) is the second season of Hong Kong Premier League, the top division of Hong Kong football.

Teams 
A total of 9 teams contested the league, including eight sides from the 2014–15 Hong Kong Premier League and one promoted from the 2014–15 Hong Kong First Division.

Stadia and locations 

Note: Table lists in alphabetical order.

Remarks:
1The capacity of Aberdeen Sports Ground reduces from 9,000 to 4,000 as only the main stand is opened for football matches.

Personnel and kits

Chairman changes

Managerial changes

Foreign players
The number of foreign players is restricted to six (including an Asian player) per team, with no more than four on pitch during matches.

Former players

League table

Positions by round

Results

Fixtures and results

Round 1

Round 2

Round 3

Round 4

Round 5

Round 6

Round 7

Round 8

Round 9

Round 10

Round 11

Round 12

Round 13

Round 14

Round 15

Round 16

Round 17

Round 18

Season statistics

Scoring

Top Scorer

Hat-tricks

Attendances

Hong Kong Top Footballer Awards

References 

Hong Kong Premier League seasons
Hong Kong
2015–16 in Hong Kong football leagues